The 2nd AIBA Asian 2004 Olympic Boxing Qualifying Tournament was held in Karachi, Pakistan from May 6 to May 12, 2004. Also known as the Green Hill Tournament it was the penultimate opportunity for Asian amateur boxers to qualify for the 2004 Summer Olympics after the 2004 Asian Amateur Boxing Championships. The top two of each division earned Olympic qualification with the exception of the heavyweight and super heavyweight divisions, in which there were no qualification opportunities.

Medal winners

Qualified

Light Flyweight (– 48 kg)

Flyweight (– 51 kg)

Bantamweight (– 54 kg)

Featherweight (– 57 kg)

Lightweight (– 60 kg)

Light Welterweight (– 64 kg)

Welterweight (– 69 kg)

Middleweight (– 75 kg)

Light Heavyweight (– 81 kg)

Notes

See also
2004 Asian Amateur Boxing Championships
1st AIBA Asian 2004 Olympic Qualifying Tournament

References
amateur-boxing

Asian 2
2004 in Pakistani sport